The  Austin Bowl  is a proposed NCAA Division I Football Bowl Subdivision college football bowl game to be played in Austin, Texas at Darrell K Royal–Texas Memorial Stadium. The college conferences that would have tie-ins with the bowl are the American Athletic Conference and the Sun Belt Conference.

History
In May 2015, the NCAA certified the Austin area for a bowl game. But bowl organizers indicated that due to the lack of time, the preparation for the game would not be sufficient.  It was then decided that organizers would resubmit their application to host the game for the 2016 Bowl season.  On April 11, 2016, the NCAA announced a freeze on new bowl games until after the 2019 season.

References

College football bowls
Annual sporting events in the United States
College football bowls in Texas